Valeriya Khanina (born 13 April 1999 in Donetsk) is a Ukrainian rhythmic gymnast. She is the 2014 Junior European ribbon silver medalist. She represented Ukraine at the 2014 Summer Youth Olympics and finished sixth in the individual all-around.

Personal life 
Valeriya Khanina was born in Donetsk, Ukraine on 13 April 1999. She moved to Kyiv in 2013. She trains at the famous Deriugins School under Albina and Irina Deriugina. Alina Maksymenko is her sports hero, and her goal is to become a World Champion.

Career

Junior
Khanina competed ball and ribbon at the 2014 Junior European Championships. The Ukrainian team finished fifth with Khanina scoring 14.858 in ball and 14.983 in ribbon. Her score in ribbon was enough for her to qualify for the final. She scored 15.750 in the final and won a silver medal behind Russia's Irina Annenkova.

Khanina was then selected to compete at the 2014 Summer Youth Olympics. She finished sixth all-around in the qualification round with a total of 54.100. In the all-around finals, Khanina once again finished sixth with a total of 53.750.

Senior
In 2016 she switched from individual to group and became a member of Ukrainian national team. She was only the reserve gymnast, so she didn't get to compete at the 2016 Olympic Games in Rio.

In 2017 season, she won bronze Group All-around medal and bronze medal in 3 Balls + 2 Ropes Final at the World Cup Pesaro. In September, she competed at the 2017 World Championships and ended on 6th place in Group All-Around Final.

In 2018, she continues to competes with the Ukrainian group. They made a sweep of golds medals at Miss Valentine Cup And Irina Deriugina cup. Then they competes at Thiais GP winning gold with hoops, silver in all-around and bronze with balls and ropes. Then they participated to FIG Worlds Cup Series. They won bronze with balls and ropes at Baku, silver and bronze with hoops and balls and ropes in Tashkent. They participated to the 2018 European Championships in Guadalajara. They finished 4th in AA, winning an amazing silver medal with hoops. They competed at the World Cup Challenge Minsk before the Worlds Championships in Sofia. Then, at the Worlds, they finished 4th in the All-Around competition and winning a bronze medal with balls and ropes. The last medal for Group Ukraine was in 2013.

Routine music information

References 

1999 births
Living people
Ukrainian rhythmic gymnasts
Deriugins Gymnasts
Gymnasts from Kyiv
Sportspeople from Donetsk
Gymnasts at the 2014 Summer Youth Olympics
Universiade medalists in gymnastics
Universiade silver medalists for Ukraine
Medalists at the 2019 Summer Universiade
21st-century Ukrainian women